"One Step Ahead" is the fourth single by American singer-songwriter-actress Debbie Gibson, from the 1990 album Anything Is Possible. The single was written by Gibson and Lamont Dozier and produced by John "Jellybean" Benitez. It was remixed for both the single and maxi single by "Little" Louie Vega and Kenny "Dope" Gonzales for Masters at Work Productions, Inc.

Although this single failed to chart on the Billboard Hot 100, it scored on the Billboard Hot Maxi Singles and Hot Dance chart, peaking at No. 21 and No. 18 respectively.

Track listing

Weekly charts

References

External links
 

1991 singles
1990 songs
Debbie Gibson songs
Songs written by Debbie Gibson
Songs written by Lamont Dozier
Atlantic Records singles
Freestyle music songs
House music songs
New jack swing songs